The North Fork Championship is a whitewater kayaking extreme race located on the North Fork of the Payette River, just north of Banks, Idaho. The North Fork of the Payette River is one of the most well known class V rivers in the world, most notably for the extremely continuous big water. The first race was held in 2012 and has become an annual race. The North Fork Championship, or NFC, on or around the second weekend in June and brings the best whitewater kayakers from around the world to race down the infamous rapid called “Jacob’s Ladder”. The NFC is unique in the sense that it takes an extremely dangerous and difficult rapid, and forces the racers to make different maneuvers in the rapid that are very challenging and that they wouldn’t normally choose to run. After just one year, American Canoe and Kayak named the North Fork Championship as the 2013 Sanctioned Event of the Year, since then it has attracted even more top level kayakers from around the globe.

Race Format

Elite Race 
The main event of the weekend on Saturday is the Elite Race on Jacobs Ladder. To race down Jacob’s Ladder, one must be invited in one of three different ways: take top 5 in the Expert Race (the qualifier), be previously voted in as one of 15 racers by The Trick Force, or be part of The Trick Force (the top 10 finishers in the previous years race).  The be voted in, paddlers must submit an application, stating why they believe they are capable of racing, as well as why they should be invited.

The Elite Race is an extreme slalom time trial. Each racer goes down the course one at a time to have the fastest time, while also navigating around “gates” that are determined by the organizers to make the racers do challenging and difficult maneuvers. Failure to go on the correct side of the gate results in a 50-second penalty, and touching the gate results in a 5-second penalty. Each racer gets 2 runs down the course, and the fastest time is recorded for the results.

Expert Race 
The Expert Race serves as the race that allows anyone that is capable of paddling the whitewater. It is held down on the S-Turn Rapid, located on the "Upper 5" section on the North Fork. This race was previously held on the "Lower 5" section of the river during the first few years. S-Turn is a class V rapid, but more manageable for a wider variety of people compared to Jacob’s Ladder. Over 150 racers go one at a time to have the fastest raw time. Motivation can be to just get out and race, beat their friends, or try and qualify for the Elite Race.

Boater X 
The Boater X is a head to head race locate on a rapid called S-turn. The top 35 racers from the Expert Race, along with the invited Elite division are allowed to compete in this race. The Boater X is not timed, it is just simply a tournament style head to head, with the top half of the racers in each heat moving on to the next round.

Results

2016: NFC V 
Elite Division

2015: NFC IV 
Elite Division

2014: NFC III 
Elite Division

2013: NFC II 
Elite Division

2012: NFC I 
Elite Division

References

2012 establishments in Idaho
Kayaking
Sports competitions in the United States